The Dragon Lady, also known as Madam Deal, was a well-known character in the U.S. comic strip Terry and the Pirates, created by Milton Caniff, and in the movie serial, comic books, and TV series based on the comic strip. Her real name is Lai Choi San, a real-life 20th century pirate.

Origin

The Dragon Lady first appeared in December 1934, in the first Sunday strip story. She began as a stereotypically beautiful, seductive and evil Asian, but as the comic strip became more realistic, the character grew more complex. Fans of the strip recall her passionate love for the journalist and man-of-action Pat Ryan, and the time she taught Terry how to dance.  In the years leading up to World War II, she became a heroic, though Machiavellian figure, leading the resistance against the Japanese invasion of China. She was described as "beautiful as Aphrodite, wise as Athena, swifter than Mercury, and stronger than Hercules."

According to Milton Caniff: Conversations, she "was modeled from a real person, as are all Caniff's characters", in this case a succession of them, starting with professional model Phyllis Johnson.

In other media
Various actresses played the Dragon Lady in the radio series of Terry and the Pirates (1937–48), including Agnes Moorehead, Adelaide Klein and Marion Sweet. In the 1940 film serial, the part was played by Sheila Darcy. Gloria Saunders was cast as the Dragon Lady in the brief 1953 television series.

Agnes Moorehead's portrayal of the Dragon Lady is mentioned in Harlan Ellison's "Jeffty is Five" as a comment marking the passage of time and things past.

See also
 Dragon Lady – the stereotype derived from the character

References

Further reading
 
 Milton Caniff, The Complete Terry and the Pirates, IDW Publishing, 2007. ,  
 R. C. Harvey, Meanwhile... A Biography of Milton Caniff, Creator of Terry and the Pirates and Steve Canyon, Fantagraphics, 2007,  .
 Smithsonian Institution, Smithsonian Collection of Newspaper Comics. Harry N. Abrams, 1978. , 

Fictional Asian people
American comics characters
Comic strip villains
Comics characters introduced in 1934
Terry and the Pirates
Female characters in comics
Fictional female pirates